Tanis is a site of paleontological interest in southwestern North Dakota, United States. Tanis is part of the heavily studied Hell Creek Formation, a group of rocks spanning four states in North America renowned for many significant fossil discoveries from the Upper Cretaceous and lower Paleocene. Tanis is a significant site because it appears to record the events from the first minutes until a few hours after the impact of the giant Chicxulub asteroid in extreme detail. This impact, which struck the Gulf of Mexico 66.043 million years ago, wiped out all non-avian dinosaurs and many other species (the so-called "K-Pg" or "K-T" extinction). The extinction event caused by this impact began the Cenozoic, in which mammals - including humans - would eventually come to dominate life on Earth.

Discoveries
 
The site was originally discovered in 2008 by University of North Georgia Professor Steve Nicklas and field paleontologist Rob Sula. Their team successfully removed fossil field jackets that contained articulated sturgeons, paddlefish, and bowfins. These fossils were delivered for research to the Field Museum of Natural History in Chicago. Recognizing the unique nature of the site, Nicklas and Sula brought in Robert DePalma, a University of Kansas graduate student, to perform additional excavations. The site was systematically excavated by Robert DePalma over several years beginning in 2012, working in near total secrecy. Key findings were presented in two conference papers in October 2017. The full paper introducing Tanis was widely covered in worldwide media on 29 March 2019, in advance of its official publication three days later. The co-authors included Walter Alvarez and Jan Smit, both renowned experts on the K-Pg impact and extinction. Other papers describing the site and its fossils are in progress.

At Tanis, unlike any other known Lagerstätte site, it appears freak circumstances allowed for the preservation of exquisite, moment-by-moment details caused by the impact event. These include many rare and unique finds, which allow unprecedented examination of the direct effects of the impact on plants and animals alive at the time of the large impact some  distant. The events at Tanis occurred far too soon after impact to be caused by the megatsunamis expected from any large impact near large bodies of water. The site formed part of a bend in an ancient river on the westward shore of the seaway, and was flooded with great force by these waves, which carried sea, land, freshwater animals and plants, and other debris several miles inland. The seiche waves exposed and covered the site twice, as millions of tiny microtektite droplets and debris from the impact were arriving on ballistic trajectories from their source in what is now the Yucatán Peninsula.

As of April 2019, reported findings include:

animals and plant material preserved in three-dimensional detail and at times upright, rather than pressed flat as usual, their remains thrown together by the massive wave movements
articulated and cartilaginous salt and freshwater fish and marine reptiles found together miles inland, with many microtektites (molten debris particles from the impact) embedded in their gills as they tried to breathe
millions of "near perfect" primary (that is, not reworked) microtektites "almost indistinguishable" in chemical composition from previously reported Chicxulub tektites found buried contemporaneous to the fossils in their own impact holes in the soft riverbed mud, and also preserved in amber on tree trunks
large primitive feathers 30–40 cm long with 3.5 mm quills believed to come from large dinosaurs 
broken remains from almost all known Hell Creek dinosaur groups

and some incredibly rare finds, such as:

fossils of hatchlings and intact eggs with embryo fossils
fossil pterosaurs for which no other fossils exist at that time
drowned ant nests with ants inside and chambers filled with asteroid debris, and
tiny inhabited burrows from some of the first mammals in the area after the impact

The hundreds of fish remains are distributed by size, and generally show evidence of tetany (a body posture related to suffocation in fish), suggesting strongly that they were all killed indiscriminately by a common suffocating cause that affected the entire population. Fragile remains spanning the layers of debris show that the site was laid down in a single event over a short timespan. A Triceratops or other ceratopsian ilium (hip bone) was found at the high water mark, in circumstances hinting that the dinosaur might speculatively have been a floating carcass and possibly alive at or just before impact, but the paper describing such remains was still in progress as of 2019 – the initial papers only include a photograph and its location within Tanis. In 2022, a partial mummified Thescelosaurus was unearthed here with its skin still intact.

The exceptional nature of the findings and conclusions have led some scientists to await further scrutiny by the scientific community before agreeing that the discoveries at Tanis have been correctly understood. The site continues to be explored.

Background

The K-Pg extinction event

The Cretaceous–Paleogene ("K-Pg" or "K-T") extinction event around 66 million years ago wiped out all non-avian dinosaurs and many other species. Proposed by Luis and Walter Alvarez, it is now widely accepted that the extinction was caused by a huge asteroid or bolide that impacted Earth in the shallow seas of the Gulf of Mexico, leaving behind the Chicxulub crater. The impactor tore through the earth's crust, creating huge earthquakes, giant waves, and a crater 180 kilometers (112 mi) wide, and blasted aloft trillions of tons of dust, debris, and climate-changing sulfates from the gypsum seabed, and it may have created firestorms worldwide. With the exception of some ectothermic species such as the ancestors of the modern leatherback sea turtle and crocodiles, no tetrapods weighing more than  survived. It marked the end of the Cretaceous period and the Mesozoic Era, opening the Cenozoic Era that continues today.

However, because it is rare in any case for animals and plants to be fossilized, the fossil record leaves some major questions unanswered. One of these is whether dinosaurs were already declining at the time of the event due to ongoing volcanic climate change. Also, there is little evidence on the detailed effects of the event on Earth and its biosphere. No fossil beds were yet known that could clearly show the details that might resolve these questions. There is considerable detail for times greater than hundreds of thousands of years either side of the event, and for certain kinds of change on either side of the K-Pg boundary layer. But relatively little fossil evidence is available from times nearer the crucial event, a difficulty known as the "Three metre problem".

Hell Creek Formation
The Hell Creek Formation is a well-known and much-studied fossil-bearing formation (geological region) of mostly Upper Cretaceous and some lower Paleocene rock, that stretches across portions of Montana, North Dakota, South Dakota, and Wyoming in North America. The formation is named for early studies at Hell Creek, located near Jordan, Montana, and it was designated as a National Natural Landmark in 1966.

The formation contains a series of fresh and brackish-water clays, mudstones, and sandstones deposited during the Maastrichtian and Danian (respectively, the end of the Cretaceous and the beginning of the Paleogene periods) by fluvial activity in fluctuating river channels and deltas and very occasional peaty swamp deposits along the low-lying eastern continental margin fronting the late Cretaceous Western Interior Seaway. The iridium-enriched Cretaceous–Paleogene boundary, which separates the Cretaceous from the Cenozoic, is distinctly visible as a discontinuous thin marker above and occasionally within the formation. Numerous famous fossils of plants and animals, including many types of dinosaur fossils, have been discovered there.

At the time of the Chicxulub impact, the present-day North American continent was still forming. Most of central North America had recently been a large shallow seaway, called the Western Interior Seaway (also known as the North American Sea or the Western Interior Sea), and parts were still submerged. This had initially been a seaway between separate continents, but it had narrowed in the late Cretaceous to become, in effect, a large inland extension to the Gulf of Mexico.

Although Tanis and Chicxulub were connected by the remaining Interior Seaway, the massive water waves from the impact area were probably not responsible for the deposits at Tanis. Any water-borne waves would have arrived between  later, long after the microtektites had already fallen back to earth, and far too late to leave the geological record found at the site. It is not even clear whether the massive waves were able to traverse the entire Interior Seaway. Seiche waves often occur shortly after significant earthquakes, even thousands of miles away, and can be sudden and violent. Some recent examples include the 1964 Alaskan earthquake (seiches in Puerto Rico), the 1950 Assam-Tibet earthquake (India/China) (seiches in England and Norway), the 2010 Chile earthquake (seiches in Louisiana).

The Chicxulub impact is believed to have triggered earthquakes estimated at magnitude , releasing up to 4000 times the energy of the Tohoku quake. This would resolve conflicting evidence that huge water movements had occurred in the Hell Creek region near Tanis much less than an hour after impact, although the first megatsunamis from the impact zone could not have arrived at the site for almost a full day.

Robert DePalma
 
Robert DePalma is a paleontologist who holds the lease to the Tanis site and controls access to it. 

In 2004, DePalma was studying a small site in the well-known Hell Creek Formation, containing numerous layers of thin sediment, creating a geological record of great detail. His advisor suggested seeking a similar site, closer to the K-Pg boundary layer. The original discoverers of the site (Rob Sula and Steve Nicklas), who worked the site for several years, recognized its scientific importance and offered it to DePalma as he had some previous experience with working on fish sites. The site lacked the fine sediment layers he was initially looking for. Instead, the layers had never fully solidified, the fossils at the site were fragile, and everything appeared to have been laid down in a single large flood. Co-author Professor Phillip Manning, a specialist in fossil soft tissues, described DePalma's working techniques at Tanis as "meticulous" and "borderline archaeological in his excavation approach". Following suspicions of manipulating data, a complained was lodged against DePalma with the University of Manchester.

Discovery and exploration of 'Tanis'
 
DePalma began excavating systematically in 2012 and quickly found the site to contain very unusual and promising features. Everything he found had been covered so quickly that details were exceptionally well preserved, and the fossils as a whole formed a very unusual collection – fish fins and complete fish, tree trunks with amber, fossils in upright rather than squashed flat positions, hundreds or thousands of cartilaginous fully articulated freshwater paddlefish, sturgeon and even saltwater mosasaurs which had ended up on the same mudbank miles inland (only about four fossilized fish were previously known from the entire Hell Creek formation), fragile body parts such as complete and intact tails, ripped from the seafish's bodies and preserved inland in a manner that suggested they were covered almost immediately after death, and – everywhere – millions of tiny spheres of glassy material known as microtektites, the result of tiny splatters of molten material reaching the ground. The microtektites were present and concentrated in the gills of about 50% of the fossilized fish, in amber, and buried in the small pits in the mud which they had made when they contemporaneously impacted. The fish were not bottom feeders. They had breathed in early debris that fell into water, in the seconds or minutes before death. The sediment appeared to have liquefied and covered the deposited biota, then quickly solidified, preserving much of the contents in three dimensions.

Later discoveries included large primitive feathers 30–40 cm long with 3.5 mm quills believed to come from large dinosaurs; broken remains from almost all known Hell Creek dinosaur groups, including some incredibly rare hatchling and intact egg with embryo fossils; fossil pterosaurs for which no other fossils exist at that time; drowned ant nests with ants inside and chambers filled with asteroid debris; and burrows of small mammals living at the site immediately after the impact. Analysis of early samples showed that the microtektites at Tanis were almost identical to those found at the Mexican impact site, and were likely to be primary deposits (directly from the impact) and not reworked (moved from their original location by later geological processes).

DePalma quickly began to suspect that he had stumbled upon a monumentally important and unique site – not just "near" the K-Pg boundary, but a unique killing field that precisely captured the first minutes and hours after impact, when the K-Pg boundary was created, along with an unprecedented fossil record of creatures and plants that died on that day, as well as material directly from the impact itself, in circumstances that allowed exceptional preservation.

 

By 2013, he was still studying the site, which he named "Tanis" after the ancient Egyptian city of the same name, and had told only three close colleagues about it. Secrecy about Tanis was maintained until disclosed by DePalma and co-author Jan Smit in two short summary papers presented in October 2017, which remained the only public information before widespread media coverage of the full prepublication paper on 29 March 2019.

Site details
Site details are as follows:

The Tanis river
The site was originally a point bar - a gently sloped crescent-shaped area of deposit that accumulates on the inside bend of streams and rivers below the slip-off slope. Point bars are common in mature or meandering streams. DePalma gave the name Tanis to both the site and the river. From the size of the deposits beneath the flood debris, the Tanis River was a "deep and large" river with a point bar that was towards the larger size found in Hell's Creek, suggesting a river tens or hundreds of meters wide. The river flowed Eastward (other than impact driven waves), with inland being to the West; Tanis itself was therefore in an ancient river valley close to the Westward shore of the Interior Seaway. Although other flooding is evidenced in Hells Creek, the Tanis deposit does not appear to relate to any other Marine transgression (inland shoreline movement) known to have taken place. The original paper describes the river in technical detail:

"the fluctuating, reticulated terminal-Cretaceous shoreline was not far away from the Tanis region"
"The Event Deposit is a 1.3-m-thick bed that shows an overall grading upward from coarse sand to fine silt/clay and is associated with a deeply incised, large meandering river ... [and] sharply overlies the aggrading surface of a point bar..."
"the point bar exhibits ∼10.5 m of isochronous elevation change along its inclined surface and its width extends <50 m perpendicular to (ancient) flow direction. These dimensions are in the upper size range for point bars in the Hell Creek Formation and compare favorably with ... modern rivers with large channels that are tens to hundreds of meters wide"
"[The Event flood deposits are] indicative of a westward or inland flow direction that is opposite of the natural (ancient) current of the ... Tanis River"
"[The] Event Deposit is restricted to (an ancient) river valley and is conspicuously absent from the adjacent floodplains."
"Tanis exhibits a depositional scenario that was unusual in being highly conducive to exceptional (largely three dimensional) preservation of many articulated carcasses (Konservat-Lagerstätte). Such Konservat-Lagerstätten are rare ... because they require special depositional circumstances. Tanis is the only known site in the Hell Creek Formation where such conditions were met, [so] the deposit attests to the exceptional nature of the [Event]. The findings each preclude correlation with either the Cantapeta or Breien marine incursions (inland-directed floodings) ... the Tanis Event Deposit cannot be correlated with the known Hell Creek marine transgressions."

The Event Deposit
The deposit itself is about 1.3m thick, sharply overlaying the point bar, in a drape-like manner. It comprises two layers with sand and silt grading (coarse sands at the bottom, finer silt/clay particles at the top). It can be divided into two layers, a bottom layer about 0.5m thick ("unit 1"), and a top layer about 0.8m thick (unit 2), capped by a 1 – 2 cm layer of impactite tonstein that is indistinguishable from other dual layered KPg impact ejection materials found in Hells Creek, and finally a layer around 6 cm thick of plant remains. The excavated pointbar and event deposits show that the point bar had been exposed to the air for a considerable time, with evidence of habitation and filled burrows, before an abrupt, turbulent, high energy event filled these burrows and laid down the deposits. The event included waves with at least 10 meters run-up height (the vertical distance a wave travels after it reaches land).

Papers

Initial papers at GSA Conference, 2017

Eighteen months before publication of the peer-reviewed PNAS paper in 2019 DePalma and his colleagues presented two conference papers on fossil finds at Tanis on 23 October 2017 at the annual meeting of the Geological Society of America. Jan Smit first presented a paper describing the Tanis site, its association with the K-Pg boundary event and associated fossil discoveries, including the presence of glass spherules from the Chicxulub impact clustered in the gill rakers of acipenciform fishes and also found in amber. DePalma then presented a paper describing excavation of a burrow created by a small mammal that had been made "immediately following the K-Pg impact" at Tanis.

PNAS paper published in 2019: Prepublication and authorship
A paper documenting Tanis was released as a prepublication on 1 April 2019. Simultaneous media disclosure had been intended via the New Yorker, but the magazine learned that a rival newspaper had heard about the story, and asked permission to publish early to avoid being scooped by waiting until the paper was published. The discovery received widespread media coverage from 29 March 2019.

 

As of April 2019, several other papers were stated to be in preparation, with further papers anticipated by DePalma and co-authors, and some by visiting researchers.

2021 and 2022 papers

Three papers were published in 2021. The first two were conference papers presented in January of that year. The last was published in December in Scientific Reports.

The first documents a turtle fossil found at Tanis, killed by impalement by a tree branch, and found in the upper of two units of surge deposit, bracketed by ejecta. This further evidences the violent nature of the event. A paper published in Scientific Reports in December 2021 suggested that the impact took place in the Spring or Early Summer, based on the cyclical isotope curves found in acipensieriform fish bones at the site, and other evidence. However, the journal later published a note in December 2022 stating that "the reliability of data presented in this manuscript [...] currently in question" following claims that data in the paper was fabricated in order to scoop a later paper published in Nature February 2022 (but submitted before the Scientific Reports paper was submitted), by a separate team, which also studied the fish skeletons found at Tanis, and also identified annual cyclical changes, and found that the impact had occurred in spring.

Other media
A BBC documentary on Tanis, titled Dinosaurs: The Final Day, with Sir David Attenborough, was broadcast on 15 April 2022.
This program was also aired as "Dinosaur Apocalypse: The Last Day" on PBS Nova starting 11 May 2022.

Notes
 This section is drawn from the original 2019 paper and its supplementary materials, which describe the site in detail. Page numbers in this section refer to those papers.

 If two earthquakes have moment magnitudes M1 and M2, then the energy released by the second earthquake is about 101.5 x (M2 – M1) times as much at the first. (Formula and details)The 2011 Tōhoku earthquake and tsunami was estimated at magnitude 9.1, so the energy released by the Chicxulub earthquakes, estimated at up to magnitude 11.5, may have been up to 101.5 x (11.5–9.1) = 3981 times larger. The 1960 Valdivia Chile earthquake was the most powerful ever recorded, estimated at magnitude 9.4 to 9.6. Using the same formula, the Chicxulub earthquakes may have released up to 1412 times as much energy as the Chile event.

References

External links
A seismically induced onshore surge deposit at the KPg boundary, North Dakota (2019) - Public readable version
 Supporting material and analysis for above paper (2019) - Public readable version, containing supplementary text, analysis, and data referred to in the main paper

Cretaceous geochronology
Cretaceous geology of North Dakota
Cretaceous–Paleogene boundary
Lagerstätten
Paleogene geology of North Dakota